Open Your Eyes is a 1919 American silent drama film directed by Gilbert P. Hamilton, and starring Faire Binney, Mrs. Joupert, Jack Hopkins, Halbert Brown, Eddie Beryll, Emily Marceau, Viola Allen, Ben Lyon, and Gaston Glass. The film was released by Warner Bros. in May 1919.

Plot

Cast
Faire Binney as Kitty Walton
Mrs. Joupert as Mrs. Walton
Jack Hopkins as Mr. Walton
Halbert Brown as Dr. Bennett
Eddie Beryll as Eddie Samson
Emily Marceau as Frances Forrester
Viola Allen as Mrs. Forrester
Ben Lyon as Harold Connors
Gaston Glass
Jack L. Warner as Soldier

Preservation
A print of the film reportedly survives in a foreign archive.

References

External links

1919 drama films
Silent American drama films
1919 films
American silent feature films
American black-and-white films
Warner Bros. films
Films directed by Gilbert P. Hamilton
1910s American films